Pteraster capensis is a species of echinoderm belonging to the family Pterasteridae.

The species is found in Southern Africa.

References

Pterasteridae
Animals described in 1847
Invertebrates of Africa